Naga Kiran, from Somarpet, Kodagu, is an Indian actor in Kannada films.  He has also acted in Telugu and Tamil movies.

Nagakiran started with modelling under ace model trainer Prasad Bidapa. After moving on to acting, he started taking roles in Telugu movies. His first movie was Something Special, opposite Sherlyn Chopra and Sunaina.

The movie did not do well at the box office. His next roles were in Kannada movies such as Marujanma, based on reincarnation, Vasanthakala, Pallavi Illada Charana, Anu opposite Pooja Ghandhi,
Mast Maja Madi, Male Barali Manju Irali,Ijjodu, Parie, and Lahari. He received critical acclaim for his role in Ijjodu, which was directed by Padma Shri and awarded MS Sathyu. Movies such as Mast Maja Madiand Male Barali Manju Irali did well at the box office. Tamil movies he has played in include Yarinda Devathai and Thallapulla, directed by Mustan.

Filmography

Television

References

External links
Sulekha Movies - Hollywood, Tamil, Telugu, Hindi Movie News, Reviews & Trailers
Archive News
Male Barali Manju Irali is a must watch

Living people
Male actors in Kannada cinema
Indian male film actors
People from Kodagu district
1983 births